John Michiner Haines (January 1, 1863 – June 4, 1917) was an American politician from the Republican Party. He served as the tenth governor of Idaho from 1913 to 1915.

Biography
Haines was born in Jasper County, Iowa. His father, Isaac L. Haines, was a Quaker, and his mother, Eliza (Bushong) Haines, was a member of the Christian Church.   He completed three years of study at William Penn University in Iowa before withdrawing from school due to poor health.  He married Mary Symons on May 20, 1883. Her father was a Quaker minister.

Career
Haines was a bank clerk in Friend, Nebraska until 1885. He then moved to Richfield, Kansas, and was very successful in the real estate industry.  He also served as deputy clerk of court in Morton County and was elected Registrar of Deeds. 
Haines, Walter E. Pierce, and L. H. Cox established a real estate business, W. E. Pierce & Company, in Boise, Idaho in 1890. He served as the Mayor of Boise from 1907 to 1909. He was elected and served as Governor of Idaho from 1913 to 1915. During his administration, a workman's compensation bill was vetoed, and a state board of education was established.

Haines lost his bid for reelection and returned to his real estate business.

Death
Haines died in Boise on June 4. 1917. He is interred  at the Morris Hill Cemetery, Boise, Ada County, Idaho, United States.

References

External links
John Haines House
National Governors Association
Idaho Genealogy Trails

1863 births
1917 deaths
American Quakers
Republican Party governors of Idaho
Mayors of Boise, Idaho
People from Jasper County, Iowa
People from Saline County, Nebraska
People from Morton County, Kansas
19th-century American politicians
20th-century American politicians